Gozmanyina majestus is a species of cosmochthoniid in the family Cosmochthoniidae.

References

Acariformes
Articles created by Qbugbot
Animals described in 1971